The Mbambe Forest Reserve is found in Cameroon, and is Government-managed. The reported area covers 285.75 km.

References

Protected areas of Cameroon
Forest reserves